Waiting For Superman may refer to:

 Waiting for "Superman", a 2010 documentary
 Waiting for Superman (song), a 2013 song by the American rock band Daughtry
 "Waiting for Superman" (Superman & Lois), an episode of Superman & Lois

See also 
 Waitin' for a Superman, a 1999 song by The Flaming Lips